Mohamed Firas Ben Larbi (born 27 May 1996) is a Tunisian professional footballer who plays as a midfielder for Ajman Club. He has represented Tunisia at senior international level.

Club career
Ben Lardi began his senior career Marsa and also played for Bizertin and Étoile du Sahel in the Tunisian Ligue Professionnelle 1. In August 2020, he joined UAE Pro League side Fujairah on loan, scoring on his league debut for the club in a 4–2 loss to Sharjah.

International career
Ben Lardi was part of the Tunisia U17 squad who competed in the 2013 FIFA U-17 World Cup, having earlier in the year competed for the same side in the 2013 African U-17 Championship. In September 2019, he was called up to the senior Tunisia squad for the first time, for their 2020 African Nations Championship qualification matches against Libya, of which he played in both matches.

International goals
Scores and results list Tunisia's goal tally first.

References

1996 births
Living people
Tunisian footballers
Tunisia youth international footballers
Tunisia international footballers
Association football midfielders
Tunisian expatriate footballers
Expatriate footballers in the United Arab Emirates
Tunisian expatriate sportspeople in the United Arab Emirates
Tunisian Ligue Professionnelle 1 players
UAE Pro League players
AS Marsa players
CA Bizertin players
Étoile Sportive du Sahel players
Fujairah FC players
Ajman Club players